Ectoedemia aegilopidella is a moth of the family Nepticulidae. It is endemic to mainland Greece and Rhodes.

The wingspan is 3.8-4.2 mm. Adults are on wing in April. There is probably one generation per year.

The larvae feed on Quercus macrolepis. They mine the leaves of their host plant. The mine consists of a contorted corridor that widens quickly. The black frass is concentrated in a broad band.

External links
bladmineerders.nl
Fauna Europaea
A Taxonomic Revision Of The Western Palaearctic Species Of The Subgenera Zimmermannia Hering And Ectoedemia Busck s.str. (Lepidoptera, Nepticulidae), With Notes On Their Phylogeny

Nepticulidae
Moths of Europe
Moths described in 1978